Greenwood is a historic plantation house located at Culpeper, Culpeper County, Virginia. It consists of a -story, three bay, center block dating to the late-18th or early-19th century, with one-story wings dated to 1823–1824.  The original section has a hall-parlor plan dwelling.  In 1825, Greenwood received as visitors the Marquis de Lafayette and former President James Monroe during Lafayette's celebrated tour as "guest of the nation." During the American Civil War Federal troops occupied the house and plantation and placed a cannon on the lawn.

It was listed on the National Register of Historic Places in 1985.

References

External links
Greenfield, State Route 621 vicinity, Jeffersonton, Culpeper County, VA: 1 photo at Historic American Buildings Survey

Historic American Buildings Survey in Virginia
Plantation houses in Virginia
Houses on the National Register of Historic Places in Virginia
Houses completed in 1824
Houses in Culpeper County, Virginia
National Register of Historic Places in Culpeper County, Virginia